Pterostylis glyphida is a plant in the orchid family Orchidaceae and is endemic to New South Wales. It was first formally described in 2008 by David Jones and given the name Speculantha glyphida. The description was published in the journal The Orchadian from a specimen collected near Tallong. In 2010, Gary Backhouse changed the name to Pterostylis glyphida. The specific epithet (glyphida) is derived from the Ancient Greek word glyphis meaning "penknife".

References

glyphida
Orchids of New South Wales
Plants described in 2008